Robin Midgley (10 November 1934 – 19 May 2007) was a director in theatre, television and radio and responsible for some of the earliest episodes of Z-Cars and for the television version of the Royal Shakespeare Company's Wars of the Roses.

Early life

Midgley was born in Torquay and educated at Blundell's School and King's College, Cambridge, where he directed plays with casts including Jonathan Miller, Sylvia Plath and Daniel Massey.

Midgley married, first, the playwright and psychotherapist Liane Aukin, and, in 1991, the dancer and choreographer Denni Sayers. His two sons from his first marriage are Baptist Minister Rev. Benjamin Midgley and Child Psychotherapist Dr. Nicholas Midgley.

Career

After Cambridge, Midgley was employed as a drama producer for BBC Radio and was posted to Jamaica, where he worked closely with the comedian and broadcaster Charles Hyatt.

Midgley’s first London stage production, Kill Two Birds, was at the St Martin's Theatre in 1961, and his first in New York City, Those That Play the Clowns, in 1966. He also worked for two seasons with Bernard Miles at the Mermaid Theatre, before taking charge of the Phoenix Arts Centre, Leicester, in 1968, a post in which he continued while simultaneously opening the new Haymarket Theatre in Leicester as its first artistic director. Musicals of note were: Joseph And The Amazing Technicolour Dreamcoat, produced several times at the Haymarket, in 1974, 1975, 1976, 1978, and 1985. This became a great favourite with audiences and was developed at the Haymarket from its first shorter schools version into the full-blown musical we know today.

Midgley was later in charge of the Cambridge Theatre Company based at the Arts Theatre (1988–91) and the Lyric Theatre, Belfast (1992–98).

His theatrical productions have included:

Boris Vian's Victor for the Royal Shakespeare Company at the Aldwych in 1964
Athol Fugard’s 1968 play Mille Miglia about Stirling Moss
Alan Ayckbourn's play How the Other Half Loves with Robert Morley in 1970
William Douglas-Home's Lloyd George Knew My Father in 1972, starring Ralph Richardson and Peggy Ashcroft
Terence Rattigan's Cause Célèbre at Her Majesty's Theatre in 1977.
Lionel Bart's musical Oliver! at the Albery Theatre in 1977, starring Roy Hudd as Fagin
The 1979 West End revival of My Fair Lady produced by Cameron Mackintosh at the Adelphi Theatre with Tony Britton, Liz Robertson, Dame Anna Neagle, Richard Caldicot and Peter Land
Petula Clark's musical Someone Like You at the Strand Theatre in 1990
John Lahr's 1991 adaptation of Richard Condon's The Manchurian Candidate at the Lyric, Hammersmith

Later life

In later life Midgley gave acting lessons to young singers at the Royal Opera House, and taught and directed at the Royal Academy of Dramatic Art.

Sources 
 
Obituary - Robin Midgley, The Guardian, 23 May 2007
http://www.arthurlloyd.co.uk/LeicesterTheatres/HaymarketTheatreLeicester.htm

External links
 15654

1934 births
2007 deaths
Alumni of King's College, Cambridge
British theatre directors
People associated with RADA
People educated at Blundell's School